Cosmariomyia is a genus of flies in the family Stratiomyidae.

Species
Cosmariomyia albarista James, 1980
Cosmariomyia argyrosticta Kertész, 1914
Cosmariomyia pallidipennis (Williston, 1901)

References

Stratiomyidae
Brachycera genera
Taxa named by Kálmán Kertész
Diptera of North America
Diptera of South America